Gul Sahib Khan is a Pakistani politician hailing from Karak District, who served as a member of the 10th Khyber Pakhtunkhwa Assembly, belonging to the Pakistan Tehreek-e-Insaf. He is also serving as chairman and member of the different committees

Political career
Khan was elected as the member of the Khyber Pakhtunkhwa Assembly from PK-40 (Karak-I) in 2013 Pakistani general election on ticket of Pakistan Tehreek-e-Insaf.

References

Living people
Pashtun people
Khyber Pakhtunkhwa MPAs 2013–2018
People from Karak District
Pakistan Tehreek-e-Insaf politicians
Year of birth missing (living people)